This is a list of color spaces, grouped by the color model that is used for part of their specification.

Models
Color models can be based on physics or human perception. Physical descriptions of color can be additive (describes mixing of light, RGB) or subtractive (describes mixing of pigment or removal of light, CMYK). Descriptions based on human perception are based on some experimental results on humans. Some models and their variants are employed in parts of the color spaces listed below.

Human perception
Instead of being based on color mixture, they are based on human experience or phenomenology.

CIE 1931 XYZ

CIE 1931 XYZ was the first attempt to produce a color space based on measurements of human color perception and the basis for almost all other color spaces.

CIEUVW

Measurements over a larger field of view than the "CIE 1931 XYZ" color space which produces slightly different results.

Uniform color spaces
Uniform color spaces (UCSs) are built such that the same geometrical distance anywhere in the color space reflects the same amount of perceived color difference. There have been many attempts at building such a color space.

As human vision has three components, the space is necessarily 3D; it is generally assigned such that one is the lightness and the other two the chroma. A uniform color space is useful for a wide range of tasks. It can be used to calculate color difference or to pick colors in a visually harmonious way, for example.

CIELUV

A modification of "CIE 1931 XYZ" to display color differences more conveniently. The CIELUV space is useful for additive mixtures of lights, due to its linear addition properties (human hue perception does not respect light addition, however).

CIELAB 

CIELAB produces a color space that is more perceptually linear than other color spaces. Perceptually linear means that a change of the same amount in a color value should produce a change of about the same visual importance. CIELAB has almost entirely replaced an alternative related Lab color space called “Hunter Lab”. This space is commonly used for surface colors, but not for mixtures of (transmitted) light.

HSLuv 

HSLuv preserves the lightness and hue components of CIELUV LCh and stretches its chroma so that every color has the same range, defined as a percentage.

Newer models 
CIELAB and CIELUV are soon recognized to be insufficient to explain the entire range of color phenomena. A range of increasingly complex color appearance models appeared to model the behavior of human vision under different viewing conditions, but ended up less used due to the added inputs required and overall algorithmic complexity.

In addition, the performance of the 1976 color spaces under different viewing conditions is not their only problem. Even under the default reference viewing condition, CIELAB is known to poorly work in blue hues. For a standard dynamic range and a fixed viewing condition, it turns out that CIELAB's simple structure suffices as long as better coefficients are used.

The IPT color space of 1998 uses new data about hue to greatly improve on CIELAB's non-constant lines of hue, although it still leaves much to be desired in its prediction of colorfulness and lightness. OKLab uses IPT data for hue and a modern CAM (CAM16) to generate lightness and colorfulness data, resulting in an improved fit over human perception under the same structure.

RGB primaries

RGB (red, green, blue) describes the chromaticity component of a given color, when excluding luminance. RGB itself is not a color space, it is a color model. There are many different color spaces that employ this color model to describe their chromaticities because the R/G/B chromaticities are one facet for reproducing color in CRT & LED displays.

sRGB

The sRGB color space (standard red, green, blue) was created jointly by Hewlett-Packard and Microsoft for use on the Internet. It has been endorsed by the W3C, Exif, Intel, Pantone, Corel, and many other industry players. It is also well accepted by open-source software such as the GIMP, and is used in proprietary and open graphics file formats such as SVG.

sRGB is intended as a common color space for the creation of images for viewing on the Internet and World Wide Web (WWW). The resultant color space closely approximates a Gamma correction of 2.2, the average response of a CRT display to linear voltage levels.

Adobe RGB

The Adobe RGB color space was developed by Adobe Systems in 1998. It was designed to encompass most of the colors achievable on CMYK color printers, but by using RGB primary chromaticities on a device such as the computer display. The Adobe RGB color space encompasses roughly 50% of the visible colors specified by the Lab color space, improving upon the gamut of the sRGB color space primarily in cyan-greens.

Adobe Wide Gamut RGB

The Adobe Wide Gamut RGB color space was developed by Adobe Systems as an alternative to the standard sRGB color space. It is able to store a wider range of color values than sRGB. The Wide Gamut color space is an expanded version of the Adobe RGB color space, developed in 1998. As a comparison, the Adobe Wide Gamut RGB color space encompasses 77.6% of the visible colors specified by the Lab color space, whilst the standard Adobe RGB color space covers just 50.6%.

One of the downsides to this color space is that approximately 8% of the colors representable are imaginary colors that do not exist and are not representable in any medium. This means that potential color accuracy is wasted by reserving these unnecessary colors.

Rec. 2100 

Rec. 2100 is a color space standardized by ITU and used for HDR-TV. It has a peak luminance of at least 1,000 cd/m2 (higher than the 100 cd/m2 limit of SDR and color spaces such as Rec. 709 and Rec. 2020). It uses a non-gamma transfer function (PQ or HLG) and system colorimetry (chromaticity of color primaries and white point) identical to Rec. 2020 system colorimetry.

Others with RGB primaries 

ProPhoto RGB color space
scRGB
DCI-P3, used primarily for digital movie projection
SMPTE 240M / SMPTE "C", used in NTSC and MUSE analog television systems
Rec. 601, used for SDTV
Rec. 709, used for HDTV
Rec. 2020, used for UHDTV
Academy Color Encoding System (ACES)

YCbCr and YUV 
The analogue YUV and digital YCbCr refer to a variety of linear methods to try to separate lightness from chroma signals in an RGB input using linear combination. As the input RGB values are gamma-corrected, such a separation does not truly produce lightness and two chroma signals, but a "luma" signal and two "chrominance" signals instead.

YUV is originally used in video: as human eyes have less resolution in its color perception, it is more economic to put more of the bandwidth in encoding Luma. The same principle is used in YCC. In YCC, separating also has the added benefit of removing most of the correlation between the input channels, therefore providing better compression.

YCoCg is a version of YCbCr with extremely simple coefficients. It results in faster computation, lossless conversion, and apparently better decorrelation.

ICtCp is used similarly to YCC in video compression, but is more appropriately described as a high dynamic range uniform color space.

Other similar color spaces:

 YPbPr
 YDbDr
 YIQ
 xvYCC
 sYCC

Cylindrical transformations

Cylindrical transformations seek to turn a color model into three components: the lightness, the colorfulness, and the hue.

HSV and HSL

HSV and HSL are transformations of Cartesian RGB primaries (usually sRGB), and their components and colorimetry are relative to the colorspace from which they are derived. HSV (hue, saturation, value), also known as HSB (hue, saturation, brightness), is often used by artists because it is often more natural to think about a color in terms of hue and saturation than in terms of additive or subtractive color components. HSL (hue, saturation, lightness or luminance), also known as HSI (hue, saturation, intensity) or HSD (hue, saturation, darkness), is quite similar to HSV, with "lightness" replacing "brightness". The difference is that a perfectly light color in HSL is pure white; but a perfectly bright color in HSV is analogous to shining a white light on a colored object. I.e. shining a bright white light on a red object causes the object to still appear red, just brighter and more intense. Shining a dim light on a red object causes the object to appear darker and less bright.

The issue with both HSV and HSL is that these approaches do not effectively separate colour into their three value components according to human perception of color. This can be seen when the saturation settings are altered — it is quite easy to notice the difference in perceptual lightness despite the "V" or "L" setting being fixed.

LCh: uniform color space
For uniform color spaces that already have a lightness component, the transformation only involves rearranging the two chroma values into colorfulness (C) and hue (h).

CIELChab and CIELChuv are cylindrical transformations of the CIELAB and CIELUV color spaces, respectively. The cylindrical coordinates C* (chroma, relative saturation) and h° (hue angle, angle of the hue in the color wheel) are specified. The CIELAB and CIELUV coordinate L* (lightness) remains unchanged.

The newer UCS systems can also be applied to a similar transform. In fact, both IPT and OKLab/OKLCH are designed for hue uniformity, a feature that is only explicitly shown after a cylindrical transformation.

Subtractive

and CMY

CMYK is used in the printing process, because it describes what kinds of inks are needed to be applied so the light reflected from the substrate and through the inks produces a given color. One starts with a white substrate (canvas, page, etc.), and uses ink to subtract color from white to create an image. CMYK stores ink values for cyan, magenta, yellow and black. There are many CMYK colorspaces for different sets of inks, substrates, and press characteristics (which change the dot gain or transfer function for each ink and thus change the appearance).

Commercial color spaces 

 Munsell color system – early perceptually-uniform color space
 Natural Color System (NCS) – perceptual
 Pantone Matching System (PMS) – standardized color reproduction (and color list)
 RAL  – standardized color matching (and color list)
 Aerospace Material Specification - Standard 595A (Supersedes (US) Federal Standard 595C)
 (US) Federal Standard 595C
 British Standard Colour (BS)
 HKS  – standardized color reproduction (and color list)

Special-purpose color spaces 

 The rg chromaticity space is used in computer vision applications, and shows the color of light (red, yellow, green, etc.), but not its intensity (dark, bright).
 LMS color space (long, medium, short), a perceptual color space based on the response functions of the cones in the retina of the eye. It is mostly used in psychophysical research.
 TSL color space is used in face and skin detection.

Obsolete color spaces 

Early color spaces had two components. They largely ignored blue light because the added complexity of a three-component process provided only a marginal increase in fidelity when compared to the jump from monochrome to two-component color.

 RG for early Technicolor film
 RGK for early color printing

References

External links
 Precise Color Communication—Konica Minolta Sensing

Color
color spaces